Millbrook, North Carolina, United States, was a village in Wake County at that time in the intersection of then Wake Forest Road and then Main Street, which is now part of East Millbrook Road.  However, the growth of Raleigh since the 1970s has swallowed up the village. Milbrook High School in Raleigh is named after the village and is located in what used to be Millbrook.

References

Geography of Wake County, North Carolina
Unincorporated communities in North Carolina
Annexed places in North Carolina